SW2 can refer to:

 Samurai Warriors 2
 Sony SmartWatch
 Star Wars: Episode II – Attack of the Clones
 Shadow Warrior 2
 SW2, postcode for Brixton, London, UK, see SW postcode area
 SW2 tram, a class of electric trams modified from the W2 tram by the Melbourne & Metropolitan Tramways Board.
 Farmway LRT station, Singapore

See also 
 S2W
 SWII (disambiguation)
 SWW (disambiguation)
 SW (disambiguation)